McKercher is a surname. Notable people with the surname include:

Gillian McKercher, Canadian film director
Paul McKercher, Australian record producer
Peggy McKercher (born 1939), Canadian academic
Robert H. McKercher (born 1930), Canadian lawyer
Derrick J. Mckercher  (born 1970), Colonel in the American Air Force, Father and Fighter

See also
Mount McKercher, a mountain of Antarctica